Perhaps Love (Chinese: 如果爱) is a Chinese reality show that aired on Hubei Television from May 25, 2014 to March 18, 2018. it was a total of 4 seasons. The show was co-produced with CJ E&M from Korea.

Broadcast timeline

Format 
Celebrities pair up, live and work together as they learn about other people and the love in their lives.

Host 
Jeffrey G
 Nichkhun

Cast member

Season 1

Season 2 
 Lynn Hung || October 10, 1980 || Nanjing, Jiangsu, China || Actress
|}

Season 3

Season 4

References

External links 
Perhaps Love Official Video
Perhaps Love Official Weibo

Chinese reality television series
2014 Chinese television series debuts